Matthew S. Mahurin (born January 31, 1959) is an American illustrator, photographer and film director. Mahurin's illustrations appear in Time, Newsweek, Mother Jones, Rolling Stone, Esquire, Forbes, and The New York Times.

Mahurin's work as a photo essayist has dealt with subjects such as homelessness, people with AIDS, the Texas prison system, abortion clinics, Nicaragua, Haiti, and Belfast. His extensive work directing music videos since 1986 have resulted in working with U2, Queensrÿche, Metallica, Dreams So Real, Jaye Muller (J.), Tracy Chapman, Tom Waits, R.E.M., Alice In Chains, Def Leppard and many other popular music performers.

Photographs by Mahurin, including Clemmons Prison, Texas (1985), Texas Prison (1988), Woman's Face in Darkness (1989) and Paris (1984), are included in the permanent collection of the Metropolitan Museum of Art.

Mahurin has a reputation for photographing himself and manipulating his own likeness in his commercial photo-illustration work. Examples of his own image appearing on magazine covers are the November 29, 1993 cover of Time, with Mahurin as Sigmund Freud, the March 14, 1994 cover of Time, with himself as a caveman and the May 17, 2004 Time cover where Mahurin posed and photographed himself as an Abu Ghraib prisoner.

Mahurin is also credited with a notorious Time cover of O. J. Simpson, featuring an altered mugshot which removed the photograph's color saturation (inadvertently making Simpson's skin darker), burned the corners, and reduced the size of the prisoner ID number. This appeared on newsstands next to an unaltered copy on the cover of Newsweek, which occasioned some controversy over photo manipulation.

Awards
Film and video
Eastman Kodak Award for Lifetime Achievement - Music Video Production Association Award (2003)
Best American Independent Feature - Hamptons International Film Festival, for Mugshot (1996)
MTV Video Music Award for Best Post-Modern Video, Orange Crush by R.E.M. (1989)
 Photography and Photo-Illustration 
Alfred Eisenstaedt Awards for Magazine Photography "Cover Photograph of the year" for January 1997 cover of Rolling Stone of Marilyn Manson, and "Cutting Edge Photo Illustration" (1998)
Art Directors Club, Merit Award for Feature Spread Illustration published by The Village Voice, "Unsafe: Why Gay Men Are Having Risky Sex" (1996)

Filmography

Feature films
Director
Feel (2006)
I Like Killing Flies (2003)
Mugshot (1996)

Photographs
Siesta (1987)

Short films
Director
The Reality of Hunger in New York City (2008)
H2 Uh-Oh (2007)

Television
Director
Imagining America "Tribe" (segment)
Alive TV "Hammer" (segment)

Videography

Director

10,000 Maniacs — "What's the Matter Here" (1987)
Alice in Chains — "Angry Chair" (1992)
Alice in Chains — "No Excuses" (1994)
Better Than Ezra — "Rosealia" (1995)
The Black Crowes — "She Talks to Angels" (1991)
Body Count — "There Goes the Neighborhood" (1992)
Bon Jovi — "Hey God" (1996)
Bonnie Raitt — "Something to Talk About" (1991)
Blind Melon — "Dear Ol' Dad" (1993)
Bush — "Everything Zen" (1994)
Bush — "Little Things" (1995)
Tracy Chapman — "Fast Car" (1988)
Cher — "Save Up All Your Tears" (1991)
Cowboy Junkies — "Sweet Jane" (1991)
Def Leppard — "Stand Up (Kick Love into Motion)" (1993)
Def Leppard — "All I Want Is Everything" (1996)
Disturbed — "The Sound of Silence" (2015)
Dreams So Real — "Rough Night In Jericho" (1988)
Melissa Etheridge — "Happy Xmas (War Is Over)" (1994)
John Fogerty — "Eye of the Zombie" (1986)
Peter Gabriel — "Mercy Street" (1986)
Peter Gabriel — "Red Rain" (1986)
Peter Gabriel — "Come Talk to Me" (1993)
Ghost — "Call Me Little Sunshine" (2022)
Corey Glover — "April Rain" (1998)
Inspiral Carpets — "Generations" (1992)
Hole — "Gold Dust Woman" (1996)
INXS with Ray Charles — "Please (You Got That...)" (1993)
Donna Lewis — "Without Love" (1996)
Marilyn Manson — "We Are Chaos" (2020)
Sarah McLachlan — "Building a Mystery" (1997) (uncredited)
Metallica — "The Unforgiven" (1991)
Metallica — "King Nothing" (1996)
Metallica — "The Unforgiven II" (1998)
Mötley Crüe — "Primal Scream" (1991)
Mötley Crüe — "Home Sweet Home '91" (1991)
Mystery Skulls — "Erase Me" (2017)
Peter Murphy — "The Scarlet Thing in You" (1995)

New Kids on the Block — "If You Go Away" (1992)
Our Lady Peace — "Clumsy" (1998)
Martin Page — "In the House of Stone and Light" (1994)
Queensrÿche — "Empire" (1990)
Queensrÿche — "Best I Can" (1990)
Queensrÿche — "Silent Lucidity" (1990)
Queensrÿche — "Another Rainy Night (Without You)" (1991)
Queensrÿche — "Bridge" (1995)
R.E.M. — "Orange Crush" (1988)
Rush — "The Pass" (1989)
Lou Reed — "What's Good" (1992)
Lou Reed — "Hookywooky" (1996)
Scorpions — "Alien Nation" (1993)
Silversun Pickups — "The Royal We" (2010)
Skid Row — "My Enemy" (1995)
Skid Row — "Into Another" (1995)
Soraya — "Suddenly" (1996)
Soul Asylum — "Misery" (1995)
Soundgarden — "Outshined" (1991)
Soundgarden — "The Day I Tried to Live" (1994)
Sting — "Gabriel's Message" (1987)
Sturgill Simpson — "Brace for Impact (Live a Little)" (2016)
Sturgill Simpson — "Breakers Roar" (2016)
Sturgill Simpson — "All Around You" (2017)
Sundays, The — "Love" (1992)
Tears for Fears — "The Tipping Point" (2021)
Therapy? — "Die Laughing" (1994)
Tom Waits — "Hold On" (1999)
Tom Waits — "What's He Building" (1999)
Tom Waits — "Hell Broke Luce" (2011)
U2 — "With or Without You" [version 1] (1987)
U2 — "Love Is Blindness" (1993)
U2 — "Song for Someone" (2015)
Ugly Kid Joe — "Cat's in the Cradle" (1993)
Ugly Kid Joe — "Busy Bee" (1993)
Urge Overkill — "Take a Walk" (1993)
Paul Westerberg — "Runaway Wind" (1993)

Photography credits
BoDeans — Love & Hope & Sex & Dreams cover, 1986
Tracy Chapman — Tracy Chapman cover, 1988
Ramones — Brain Drain, cover, 1989
Ozzy Osbourne — No More Tears, cover, 1991
Joe Satriani — The Extremist cover, 1992
Marilyn Manson — Rolling Stone cover, January 1998 issue
Tom Waits — Mule Variations cover, 2000
Tom Waits — Alice, cover and concept, 2002
Joan as Police Woman— To Survive cover, 2008
Muse — Drones cover, 2015
Fool In The Box — Fool In The Box III cover, 2018

Bibliography
 cover art 
The Doctor and the Soul — Book on Logotherapy by Dr. Viktor E. Frankl, cover, 1985 edition
 photography books 
Matt Mahurin
Japan and America
 illustrated by for children 
My Beautiful Child
Once Upon a Cloud

References

External links
Personal web site at MM

Archives for licensing at ProFile Stock

1959 births
Living people
American music video directors
American illustrators
American photographers
Moorpark College alumni
People from Santa Cruz, California
Film directors from California